In human anatomy, the pterygopalatine fossa (sphenopalatine fossa) is a fossa in the skull. A human skull contains two pterygopalatine fossae—one on the left side, and another on the right side. Each fossa is a cone-shaped paired depression deep to the infratemporal fossa and posterior to the maxilla on each side of the skull, located between the pterygoid process and the maxillary tuberosity close to the apex of the orbit. It is the indented area medial to the pterygomaxillary fissure leading into the sphenopalatine foramen.  It communicates with the nasal and oral cavities, infratemporal fossa, orbit, pharynx, and middle cranial fossa through eight foramina.

Structure

Boundaries
It has the following boundaries:
 anterior: superomedial part of the infratemporal surface of maxilla
 posterior: root of the pterygoid process and adjoining anterior surface of the greater wing of sphenoid bone
 medial: perpendicular plate of the palatine bone and its orbital and sphenoidal processes
 lateral: pterygomaxillary fissure
 inferior: part of the floor is formed by the pyramidal process of the palatine bone.

Passages
The following passages connect the fossa with other parts of the skull:

Functions
The pterygopalatine fossa contains
 the pterygopalatine ganglion suspended by nerve roots from the maxillary nerve
 the terminal third of the maxillary artery
 the maxillary nerve (CN V2, the second division of the trigeminal nerve), with which is the nerve of the pterygoid canal, a combination of the greater petrosal nerve (preganglionic parasympathetic) and the deep petrosal nerve (postganglionic sympathetic).  To obtain block anesthesia of the entire second division of the trigeminal nerve, an intraoral injection can be administered into this area.

See also

 Pterygopalatine canal (disambiguation)
 Fossa in the Human Body

Additional images

References

External links
 Interactive at Columbia.edu

Bones of the head and neck